The mythology relating to this subject arises from Ancient Middle East and Jewish origins. The Hebrew monster Leviathan found in the Book of Job has in particular given rise to many incarnations in popular culture, film, and literature. However, this article includes subjects with no direct connection to ancient sources.

Origins
The Leviathan of the Book of Job is a reflection of the older Canaanite Lotan, a primeval monster defeated by the god Baal Hadad. Parallels to the role of Mesopotamian Tiamat defeated by Marduk have long been drawn in comparative mythology, as have been wider comparisons to dragon and world serpent narratives such as Indra slaying Vrtra or Thor slaying Jörmungandr, but Leviathan already figures in the Hebrew Bible as a metaphor for a powerful enemy, notably Babylon (Isaiah 27:1), and some 19th century scholars have pragmatically interpreted it as referring to large aquatic creatures, such as the crocodile. The word later came to be used as a term for "great whale", as well as for sea monsters in general.

Literature

Leviathan (or more precisely  Leviathan or The Matter, Forme and Power of a Common-Wealth Ecclesiasticall and Civil is the title of Thomas Hobbes' 1651 work on the social contract and the origins of creation of an ideal state.

In Paradise Lost, Milton compares the size of Satan to that of Leviathan:

[Satan] Prone on the Flood, extended long and large
Lay floating many a rood, in bulk as huge
As whom the Fables name of monstrous size,
Titanian, or Earth-born, ...
or that Sea-beast
Leviathan, which God of all his works
Created hugest that swim th' Ocean stream. (Paradise Lost, Book 1: lines 195-202)

William Blake's poem "Jerusalem" has the two monsters Behemoth and Leviathan represent war by land and by sea. This relationship is explicitly seen in Blake's two pictures showing Admiral Nelson and William Pitt [(1759–1806) (Prime Minister of Great Britain (1783–1801 and 1804–1806] included in this display. One interpretation of this design is that these beasts stand for the hopelessness of material nature. The Lord is pointing out to Job the negativeness of his faith so far.

The German poet Heinrich Heine mentions Leviathan in his Romanzaro. A Rabbi tells his Catholic opponent in a debate (the "Disputation") that every day of the year, but one,  the God of the Jews plays for an hour with the fish at the bottom of the sea. God will one day serve the flesh of Leviathan to his chosen people. The poem gives the recipe that God will use to cook the giant fish. It will be served with garlic, raisins and rettich.

Herman Melville's novel Moby Dick (1851) alludes to the Biblical whale, and major influences on Melville were the Bible, and poet John Milton, who in Paradise Lost compares Satan to Leviathan – see above.

20th century and later
George Oppen 1962 poem "Leviathan". There's a poem by W. S. Merwin with the same title.

The narrative history book Against His-Story, Against Leviathan by Fredy Perlman critically explores the progress of Hobbes's Leviathan, as western civilization, inspiring and defining Anti-civilization theory.

In the Dungeons and Dragons novel Darkwalker on Moonshae, set in the Forgotten Realms world, the author, Douglas Niles, presents the Leviathan as a giant sea creature that fights the forces of evil on behalf of the Earthmother, an aspect of Chauntea.

Leviathan is the title of a 1992 novel by Paul Auster.

In Steven Brust's 1994 novel To Reign in Hell, Leviathan (female in this case) is one of seven elder inhabitants of Heaven who conspire to prevent Yahweh from creating the Earth as a sanctuary for himself and those loyal to him.

In Boris Akunin's novel Murder on the Leviathan, Leviathan is the name of a gigantic steamship.

Leviathan is a horror comic series created by Ian Edginton and D'Israeli about a mile-long cruise liner which, on her maiden voyage to New York, disappeared and has spent the last twenty years lost in an endless and lifeless ocean. It was published in the British magazine 2000 AD starting in 2003.

Jim Butcher's series, Codex Alera, mentions leviathans as part of the Alera realm, a species of giant creatures swimming in the river and seas. In the 4th book of the series, Captain's Fury the main characters attempt to trick their enemy by swimming past their ship when leviathans are nearby. The leviathans also make their appearance in the 5th book, the Princeps' Fury, when Aleran and Canim armies cross the sea on ships.

Leviathan is the name of a 2009 novel by Scott Westerfeld about an alternate history in World War I.

Leviathan is the name of a Soviet-based terrorist organization in Marvel Comics.

Mike Carey's ongoing comic The Unwritten features Leviathan as a central character/force of nature that lies at the heart of the plot.

In DC Comics, Leviathan is one of Talia al Ghul's aliases; it is also the name of a criminal organization she founded.

Leviathan Wakes (2011) is the first novel in the science fiction series The Expanse by James S. A. Corey and was a Hugo Awards Best Novel nominee and Locus Awards Best Science Fiction Novel nominee in 2012.  Leviathan Falls (2021) is the ninth novel in the series.

Music
The American progressive metal band Mastodon named their second album Leviathan in reference to the Herman Melville novel Moby-Dick, on which the concept of the album is based.

Neal Morse, progressive rock composer, wrote a song called Leviathan for his 2008 album Lifeline. The song is based on all biblical references to the creature.

The power metal band Alestorm mention Leviathan multiple times in their albums, specifically "Leviathan" and "Death Throes of the Terrorsquid".

Solo artist black metal band Leviathan from San Francisco - founded and fronted by Jef Whitehead.

Swedish electronic band Covenant has a track named "Leviathan" on their album Europa (1998).

Danish rock band Volbeat released a track called "Leviathan" in mid-2019 for their album, Rewind, Replay, Rebound.

Film and TV

In the television series, Farscape (1999-2003), Leviathans are sentient spaceships, with the ship Moya used by the main characters being one of them. More details can be seen on the wiki page List of races in Farscape.

In the gothic soap opera Dark Shadows, the Leviathans are an ancient race of beings who ruled the Earth before mankind came into existence. Their forms were hideous and inhuman, although many Leviathans took human shape after they lost control of the planet. They longed to return to the Earth and reclaim it as their own.

Leviathan is a 1989 science-fiction horror film about a hideous creature that stalks and kills a group of people in a sealed environment, in a similar way to such films as Alien (1979) and The Thing (1982).

In the 2001 Disney animated film Atlantis: The Lost Empire, the Leviathan is a gigantic and terrifying Atlantean war machine which looks like a giant lobster a hundred times the dimension of even the largest man-made sea vessel. It serves as the guardian of the entrance to Atlantis, which lies at the bottom of the Atlantic Ocean. In the opening scene it is revealed to the Atlantean viking ship, but after Atlantis sank it became aquatic. In 2003 sequel Atlantis: Milo's Return, it is revealed that it is still guarding the entrance to Atlantis, but it didn't attack Milo's friends upon their return since, thanks to their crystals, it knew they were friends.

In the television series Supernatural, the Leviathans are an ancient race of monsters that were freed from Purgatory when the angel Castiel absorbed its entire population. Described by Death as God's original creations (created before angels and humanity but locked away because they proved too dangerous), Leviathans are capable of shape-shifting into human form after contact with their DNA, able to eat virtually anything and almost indestructible. They are only vulnerable to the household chemical Borax and being stabbed with the bone of a righteous mortal (Sister Mary Constant) soaked in blood from the three fallen: a fallen Angel (Castiel), Ruler of fallen humanity (Crowley) and the father of fallen beasts (Alpha Vampire).

In the Ninjago: Masters of Spinjitzu episode "The Last Voyage", Zane's father is revealed to be still alive and trapped on a prison surrounded by water and guarded by a squid-like creature known as a Leviathon.

Dave Bautista wrestled under the name Leviathan in the early 2000s for Ohio Valley Wrestling, WWE's developmental territory at the time before he got called up to the main roster.

In the television series, Elementary, the episode "The Leviathan" features an impossible to crack bank vault named The Leviathan, hence the title of the episode.

In the television Series Red Dwarf, the season seven episode "Epideme" features a ship called the Leviathan which the Red Dwarf crew discover buried in the middle of an ice planetoid.

In the television series Marvel's Agent Carter, which also set in Marvel Cinematic Universe, Leviathan is a callsign of the possible head of the enemy operation.

In the DC Comics-based Supergirl, Leviathan appears as a criminal organization.

Leviathan is a 2014 film by the Russian director Andrei Zvyagintsev

In the 2016 television series Legends of Tomorrow, Vandal Savage uses a giant robot created from Palmer's technologies known as the Leviathan to crush rebellion forces. In order to stop it, The Atom, grows to the same dimension to fight it.

In the 2019 film, Godzilla: King of the Monsters, a Titan named Leviathan is contained in Outpost 49, situated in Loch Ness. Job 41:12-34 appears in the beginning of the epilogue of the movie's official novelization, in reference to the physiological similarities between Godzilla and Leviathan as described by the passage.

Video games
The Pokémon Kyogre is based on a Leviathan.

Leviathan is a recurring creature in the Final Fantasy RPG series, often encountered as an obstacle or boss, as well as a water-based Summon spell.

In the game Dishonored, it is hinted that the original form of the Outsider, a mystical figure who grants the protagonist Corvo magical powers, is a leviathan. 

In the Mass Effect 3 DLC, Mass Effect: Leviathan, the protagonists investigate a derelict Reaper codenamed "Leviathan", and wind up encountering the ancient aquatic species responsible for the creation of the Reapers, who are unofficially dubbed Leviathans.

In the first Borderlands 2 DLC Captain Scarlett, the Leviathan is mentioned several times, large skeletons of what could be the creature decorating the land, and a Leviathan is fought as a boss battle.

In Devil May Cry 3, the Leviathan (a gigantic flying Whale-like creature) was released into the human world after Vergil and Arkham summoned the Temen-ni-gru tower into the human world to obtain Sparda's power for themselves. The demon is eventually killed by Dante after he destroys it from the inside.

In Mega Man Zero, one of the main characters is a Reploid named Fairy Leviathan, who is a member of the Maverick Hunter organization of Neo Arcadia. 

In the game series Gears of War the Leviathan was a species of aquatic animals that lived in bodies of deep water and later on the surface. In the game they were feared by another enemy, the Locust, who wouldn't go near their territory.

In Skullgirls, Leviathan is a bony serpent parasite who assists the undead character Squigly, having more of a mutual bond than a parasitic one. He often uses fire and other dragon-related attacks to help her in her battles.

In Darksiders Leviathan's Drift in Darksiders and The Leviathan is a massive Dragon-like creature that appears in the Darksiders II: Death's Door Comic.

In Subnautica, the Leviathan classification is given only to the largest organisms dominating their local habitat, and is the largest group in the game. Most members of the Leviathan class have either a serpentine body shape or are propelled by tentacles, similar to many classical depictions of Leviathans.

In Destiny, the Leviathan is a massive undersea creature who tries to prevent one of the game's main antagonistic races, the Hive, from becoming corrupted, but ultimately fails. In its sequel Destiny 2, the Leviathan is the unrelated name of a massive, world-eating starship which houses the former Cabal Emperor and is also the name of the game's first Raid, which takes place upon said ship.

A Leviathan built from an agglomeration of souls drowned in the Styx appears as the final boss of the Wrath area in Ultrakill.

Anime
In both the manga and anime versions of Fullmetal Alchemist, Leviathan is the demon representation of Envy, one of the seven deadly sins.

In the Yu-Gi-Oh! anime series, the "Great Leviathan" is an antagonistic force and a gigantic serpent dragon responsible for the destruction of Atlantis.

The Digimon Leviamon is based upon the Leviathan.  He is depicted as a giant red alligator, and is one of the Seven Great Demon Lords, amongst them representing the sin of envy. Leviathan is also the main antagonist of Digimon Universe: App Monsters.

In the light novel and anime Gosick, Leviathan is the name of a famous alchemist whose true life and fate is one of the main mysteries on the story.

In Reborn! there is a character named Leviathan who represents the sin Envy.

In Leviathan ~The Last Defense~, Leviathan, pronounced Leviatan, is the name of one of the main protagonists. She is a Water-affiliated mage that can transform into a human/dragon hybrid. Her two companions, Bahamut and Jörmungandr, also share the names of other mythical aquatic monsters. They can also transform into human/dragon hybrids and are affiliated with Fire and Earth, respectively.

In High School DxD, Leviathan is one of the Four Devil Kings. She is in charge of foreign affairs for the Devils.

Other
One of the newest roller coasters (also the tallest in Canada) at the Canada's Wonderland amusement park is called the Leviathan.

In the SCP Foundation mythos, SCP-169 is a massive marine arthropod  in length, historically known as the Leviathan. The creature, which resembles an archipelago when viewed by sailors at sea level, lives in the South Atlantic Ocean and "possibly" the Drake Passage, and was responsible for the Bloop.

In the 3.5 edition supplement Elder Evils for Dungeons & Dragons Leviathan is one of the abominations profiled, described as a colossal sea monster so huge it encircles the entire world. It is composed of leftover chaotic energies from creation.

In the tabletop game Shadowrun, leviathans are one of the four types of dragons, alongside eastern dragons, western dragons, and feathered serpents.

References

Animals in popular culture
Demons in popular culture
Fictional whales
Mythology in popular culture